The Kara Darya (قارا-دارىيا; , Қорадарё, قارەدەريا ,  - literally black river) is a major river in southern Kyrgyzstan and eastern Uzbekistan. It is one of the source rivers of the Syr Darya (the second largest river of Central Asia), the other source river is the Naryn. The Kara Darya is formed by the confluence of the rivers Kara-Kulja and Tar.

The upper Kara Darya flows northwest across eastern Osh Region southwest of and parallel to the Fergana Range. It enters the Fergana Valley and Uzbek territory a few kilometres west of Özgön. In its lower course through the Fergana Valley it is used for irrigation. There is a dam at Kuyganyor (north of Andijan) where part of its water is diverted into the Great Fergana Canal. The Andijan Dam, built in 1973, created the Andijan Reservoir.

There are more than 200 known tributaries of Kara Darya; the largest are, from source to mouth:
Kara-Kulja (right)
Tar (left)
Jazy (right)
Kurshab (left)
Kögart (right)
Kara-Üngkür (right)
Aravansay (left)

References 

Tributaries of the Syr Darya